Hung I-Hsiang or Hong Yixiang (1925–1993) was a Taiwanese martial artist who specialized in the internal Chinese styles of xingyiquan, baguazhang, and taijiquan.

Hung I-Hsiang was born in Taiwan. He studied with Chang Chun-Feng, a master of internal Chinese martial arts from Northern China. Chang introduced these arts to Taiwan in 1948, when he moved there following the Chinese Communist Revolution. Initially, Chang was met with resistance from mainlanders on Taiwan who objected to his teaching the secrets of internal martial arts to native Taiwanese such as Hung.

When Chang began teaching in the northern part of Taipei, his first group of core students included the three Hung brothers: Hung I-Hsiang, Hung I-Wen, and Hung I-Mien. It is said that Hung I-Hsiang was the xingyiquan specialist, Hung I-Mien was the baguazhang specialist, and Hung I-Wen specialized in taijiquan.

After he had studied with Chang for several years, Hung often led classes for Chang. Because the internal martial arts were still very new in Taiwan, many curious people would come to test Chang's skill.  Hung said that Chang would often send him out to show the visitors what the internal styles were all about. Many martial artists in Taiwan remember Hung as being someone who was involved in many fights, both in and out of the martial arts studio.

In the mid-1960s, Hung I-Hsiang opened up his own school under the name Tang Shou Tao.

Hung I-Hsiang internal arts training program included xingyiquan, baguazhang and Wu (Hao)-style taijiquan, Shaolin kung fu, and qigong. He suggests that students learn Shaolin kung fu when they are very young, progress to xingyiquan to learn how to develop internal power, and then progress to baguazhang and taijiquan to learn how to refine the power. This is also the teaching sequence used by Hung's teacher, Chang Chun-Feng. Hung believed that in practicing the xingyiquan five elements as an introduction to the internal martial arts, the student can clearly understand the way the body should be trained to move in the internal styles. If the student starts out in taijiquan, it is very difficult to develop and understand internal power.

Many of Hung's students dominated the full-contact tournaments in Taiwan. One student, Weng Hsien-ming, won the Taiwan full contact championships three years in a row. Another, Huang Hsi-I, also usually won his all-Taiwan full contact tournaments with knock-outs.

References

 Miller, Dan, Pa Kua Chang Journal, Vol. 3, No. 5.
 Frantzis, Bruce Kumar, The Power of Internal Martial Arts: Combat Secrets of Ba Gua, Tai Chi, and Hsing-I

External links
 

1925 births
1993 deaths
Chinese baguazhang practitioners
Chinese xingyiquan practitioners
Martial arts school founders
Taiwanese martial artists
20th-century philanthropists